Noel Monkman (1896–1969) was an Australian filmmaker, born in New Zealand, best known for specialising in underwater photography. He was a press photographer in New Zealand before moving to Australia and jointing the Orpheum Theatre orchestra.

He established Australian Educational Films with F.W. Thring, directing a series of educational nature films about the Great Barrier Reef. He later made several documentaries as well as two dramatic feature films. He collaborated throughout his career with his wife Kitty.

He and Kitty lived for a time on Green Island, acting as a volunteer air observer during World War II.

Selected filmography
 Secrets of the Sea (1931) - director (documentary)
 The Cliff Dwellers (1932) - director (documentary)
 Coral and its Creatures (1932) - director (documentary)
 Typhoon Treasure (1938) – writer, director
 The Power and the Glory (1941) – writer, director
 Marvels of Miniature (1950) - documentary
 King of the Coral Sea (1954) – underwater photography
 Deep Down Under (1956) - director (TV documentary)
 Coral Kingdom (1958) – director

Writings
Escape to Adventure (1956)
From Queensland to the Great Barrier Reef : a naturalist's adventures in Australia (1958)
Quest for the Curly-Tailed Horses (1962) - autobiography

References

External links 
 
 Noel Monkman at Trove
 Noel Monkman at National Film and Sound Archive

Australian film directors
Underwater photographers
1896 births
1969 deaths
New Zealand emigrants to Australia